Fenerbahçe Sailing is the men's and women's sailing and windsurfing department of Fenerbahçe S.K., a major sports club in Istanbul, Turkey. The department consists of optimist, laser, 420, 470 and windsurf teams and uses the Dereağzı Facilities, belonging to the club.

Current squad

Technical staff

Notable athletes
Nazlı Çağla Dönertaş (born 1991), female yacht racer
Alican Kaynar (born 1988), yacht racer
Çağla Kubat (born 1979), female windsurfer
Cafer Cicibıyık (born 1991), 470 sailor
Caner Cicibıyık (born 1991), 470 sailor

References

External links
Official Fenerbahçe website  

Sailing
Sport in Kadıköy
Sailing in Turkey
1910 establishments in the Ottoman Empire